The Italy women's national basketball team represents Italy in international women's basketball competitions. At the European Women's Basketball Championship the Italian team won Gold medals in 1938.

Italy is the leading nation in terms of EuroBasket Women qualifications. (Alongside France)

Honours

Competition record
Results in final tournaments and qualifying games

Team

Current roster
Roster for the EuroBasket Women 2021.

Head coach position
Roberto Ricchini – 2011–2015
Andrea Capobianco – 2015–

See also
Italy at the team sports international competitions
Italy women's national under-19 basketball team
Italy women's national under-17 basketball team
Italy women's national 3x3 team

References

External links

FIBA profile
Archived records

 
Women's national basketball teams